Isaac Nathan (15 January 1864) was an English composer, musicologist, journalist and self-publicist, who has been called the "father of Australian music".

Early success
Isaac Nathan was born around 1791 in the English city of Canterbury to a hazzan (Jewish cantor) born in Poland, Menahem Monash "Polack" (the Pole), and his English Jewish wife, Mary (Lewis) Goldsmid (1779–1842). He was initially destined for his father's career and went to the school of Solomon Lyon in Cambridge. Showing an enthusiasm for music, he was apprenticed to the London music publisher Domenico Corri. He also claimed to have had five years of voice lessons with Corri, who had studied with Nicola Porpora. In 1813 he conceived the idea of publishing settings of tunes from synagogue usage and persuaded Lord Byron to provide the words for these. The result was the poet's famous Hebrew Melodies. Nathan's setting of these remained in print for most of the century.

The Hebrew Melodies used, for the most part, melodies from the synagogue service, though few if any of these were in fact handed down from the ancient service of the Temple in Jerusalem, as Nathan claimed. Many were European folk-tunes that had become absorbed into the synagogue service over the centuries with new texts (contrafacta). However they were the first attempt to set out the traditional music of the synagogue, with which Nathan was well acquainted through his upbringing, before the general public. To assist sales, Nathan recruited the famous Jewish singer John Braham to place his name on the title page, in return for a share of profits, although Braham in fact took no part in the creation of the Melodies.

The success of the Melodies gave Nathan some fame and notoriety. Nathan was later to claim that he had been appointed as singing teacher to the Princess Royal, Princess Charlotte, and music librarian to the Prince Regent, later George IV. There is no evidence for this, although his edition of the Hebrew Melodies was dedicated to the Princess by royal permission.

Decline

In 1816, Byron left England, never to return (nor to communicate further with Nathan). In 1817 Nathan's royal pupil Princess Charlotte died in childbirth. He thus lost his two major patrons.

Nathan undertook a runaway marriage with a music pupil, and another after his first wife's early death. Both spouses were Christian; however for both, Nathan also undertook and arranged synagogue marriages after the church ceremony. His hot temper probably accounts for a duel he fought over the honor of Lady Caroline Lamb, and his assault on an Irish nobleman who he thought had impugned one of his female pupils. The latter saw Nathan prosecuted, although he was acquitted. Nathan felt a special attachment for Lady Caroline; she was godmother to one of his children and he wrote her an appreciative poem in Hebrew, which he reprints in his Recollections of Lord Byron.

Gambling on prize-fights was one cause of his financial problems. He may have spent at least some months in debtors' prisons. He wrote frequently for the popular press in London on boxing and music. He wrote comic operas for the London stage, and four of these were produced between 1823 and 1833. His copyright for Hebrew Melodies ought to have brought him income – at one point he sold it to his married sister, presumably to avoid it being lost in bankruptcy – but it became involved in complex legal disputes. He attempted a publishing business in partnership with his brother Barnett Nathan, who later became proprietor of Rosherville Gardens.  Nathan published a history of music (1823), dedicated by permission to King George IV, which shows in its treatment of Jewish music a great deal of understanding of the Bible and of Jewish traditions.
 
Nathan also attracted some renown as a singing teacher. One of his pupils was another great English poet, the very young Robert Browning, who 60 years later recalled: 'As for singing, the best master of four I have, more or less, practiced with was Nathan, Author of the Hebrew Melodies; he retained certain traditional Jewish methods of developing the voice'.

Australian resurgence

Nathan claimed to have undertaken some mysterious services for the Royal Family, but the Whig government under Lord Melbourne, Lady Caroline Lamb's husband, refused to pay him, leading to his financial embarrassment. He emigrated to Australia with his children, arriving in April 1841. There he became a leader of local musical life, acting as music adviser both to the synagogue and to the Roman Catholic cathedral in Sydney. He gave first or early performances in Australia of many of the works of Mozart and Beethoven. On 3 May 1847, his Don John of Austria, the first opera to be written, composed and produced in Australia, was performed at the Royal Victoria Theatre, Sydney. He was the first to research and transcribe indigenous Australian music, and also set lyrics by the poet Eliza Hamilton Dunlop.

Death and descendants

The London Jewish Chronicle of 25 March 1864 reported from Sydney:

Mr. Nathan was a passenger by No. 2 tramway car […] [he] alighted from the car at the southern end, but before he got clear of the rails the car moved onwards […] he was thus whirled round by the sudden motion of the carriage and his body was brought under the front wheel.

The horse-drawn tram was the first in Sydney: Nathan was Australia's (indeed the southern hemisphere's) first tram fatality.

He was buried in Sydney; his tomb is at Camperdown Cemetery.

Many of Nathan's descendants became leading Australian citizens. Later descendants include four brothers – the conductor Sir Charles Mackerras; the psephologist Malcolm Mackerras; the headmaster of Sydney Grammar School Alastair Mackerras: the Sinologist Colin Mackerras – and their nephew, the conductor Alexander Briger.

Summary

Nathan's Hebrew Melodies was in print in England at least until the 1850s and was known across Europe.

Moreover, Nathan can claim some credit as inspiring Byron's texts. These not only in themselves diffused a spirit of philosemitism in cultured circles (indeed they became perhaps Byron's most genuinely popular work); but they were used as the basis for settings by many other composers in the nineteenth century, both Jewish (Felix and Fanny Mendelssohn, Joachim) and gentile (Schumann, Loewe, Bruch, Mussorgsky, Balakirev, and others).

Nathan's writings on music had little direct influence, small sales, and received no serious reviews in the press. In isolation, he struck upon and highlighted a theme which was at the time a major concern of the Jewish intellectual movement in Germany; the delineation and promotion of a genuine Jewish culture. The same spirit seems to have motivated his pioneering work with the music of the indigenous Australians.

Finally, Nathan's indomitable refusal to admit defeat in life in exile – he undoubtedly paralleled himself with his hero Byron – has enabled him, from his concertising and writings on Aboriginal music, to be justly remembered by antipodean musicologists as "the father of Australian music".

Tribute
Peter Sculthorpe wrote an orchestral piece in 1988 called "At the Grave of Isaac Nathan".

Portrait
Portrait of Isaac Nathan held by the National Library of Australia.

References

Bibliography 

 
 Conway, David (2012) Jewry in Music: Entry to the Profession from the Enlightenment to Richard Wagner, Cambridge: Cambridge University Press. 
 Nathan, Isaac (1836) Musurgia vocalis : an essay on the history and theory of music and on the qualities, capabilities, and management of the human voice. London: Fentum, 1836.
 Slonimsky, N (ed,) Baker's Biographical Dictionary of Musicians, New York: G. Schirmer, 1958.
 Young, Percy M. (1990) Review of Burwick & Douglass,  in Music & Letters, Vol. 71, No. 1 (Feb. 1990), pp. 148–150

External links

Interpretations

, Nyssa Milligan, soprano; Katrina Faulds, piano
, James Doig, tenor; Katrina Faulds, piano
Resources on Isaac Nathan in MusicAustralia
Lord Byron's Matzos
Isaac Nathan and Lady Caroline Lamb

The Late Mr. Isaac Nathan The Sydney Morning Herald 21 January 1864

1790s births
1864 deaths
19th-century British composers
19th-century classical composers
19th-century English musicians
19th-century British male musicians
Australian opera composers
British music educators
English classical composers
English emigrants to Australia
English gamblers
English Jews
English male classical composers
English opera composers
English sportswriters
Ethnomusicologists
Jewish classical composers
Jewish opera composers
Male opera composers
Musicians from Kent
People from Canterbury
Road incident deaths in New South Wales
19th-century musicologists